Freddy González may refer to:

Alfredo Cantu Gonzalez (1946–1968), United States Marine Corps sergeant, nicknamed "Freddy"
Fredi González (born 1964), Cuban Major League baseball manager
Fredy González (born 1975), Colombian road racing cyclist
Freddy González (runner) (born 1977), Venezuelan long-distance runner 
Freddy Gonzalez (Filipino footballer) (born 1978), Filipino football forward
Freddy González (Colombian footballer) (born 1988), Colombian football defender